The second season of the Russian reality talent show The Voice Kids premiered on February 13, 2015 on Channel One. Dmitry Nagiev returned as the show's presenter. Dima Bilan, Pelageya and Maxim Fadeev returned as coaches. Sabina Mustaeva won the competition and Maxim Fadeev became the winning coach for the second time.

Coaches and presenters

Dima Bilan, Pelageya, and Maxim Fadeev return for their second season as coaches.

Dmitry Nagiev return for his second season as a presenter. Anastasia Chevazhevskaya replaced Natalia Vodianova as a co-presenter.

Teams
Colour key

Blind auditions
Colour key

Episode 1 (February 13)
The coaches performed "Ob-La-Di, Ob-La-Da" at the start of the show.

Episode 2 (February 20)

Episode 3 (February 27)

Episode 4 (March 6)

Episode 5 (March 13)

The Battles
The Battles round started with the first half of episode 6 and ended with the first half of episode 8 (broadcast on March 20, 27, 2015; on April 3, 2015). 
Contestants who win their battle will advance to the Sing-off rounds.
Colour key

The Sing-offs
The Sing-offs round started with the second half of episode 6 and ended with the second half of episode 8 (broadcast on March 20, 27, 2015; on April 3, 2015). 
Contestants who was saved by their coaches will advance to the Final.
Colour key

Live shows
Color key:

Week 1: Live Playoffs (April 11)
Each coach brought back three artists who were eliminated in the Sing-offs.
Playoff results were voted on in real time. Nine artists sang live and six was eliminated by the end of the night.
Three saved artists advanced to the Final.

Week 2: Final (April 17)

Reception

Ratings

References

2
2015 Russian television seasons